Tyler Stinson (born January 17, 1986) is an American mixed martial artist and professional wrestler, who most recently competed in the Welterweight division. A professional competitor since 2006, Stinson has also formerly competed for Bellator MMA, Strikeforce, Titan FC, and the World Series of Fighting.

Background
Born and raised in Winfield, Kansas, Stinson competed in baseball, football, and track and field at Winfield High School, and was talented . Stinson was introduced to MMA by a friend at the age of 20, which piqued his interest. Less than a week later, Stinson began competing himself.

Mixed martial arts career

Early career
Stinson started his career in 2006. From his mixed martial arts debut until the beginning of 2010, he fought mainly for southern American promotions, as C3 Fights, Art of Fighting and Masters of the Cage.

Stinson compiled a record of 17-5 before signing with Bellator. Stinson earned his contract at an open tryout held by Bellator in Kansas.

Bellator
Stinson was expected to make his debut against Demi Deeds on April 29, 2010, at Bellator 16. However, he was called to replace an injured Sean Pierson against Dan Hornbuckle in the Season Two Welterweight Tournament Quarterfinal on April 22, 2010, at Bellator 15. Stinson lost via submission in the first round.

Stinson faced Leonardo Peçanha on June 17, 2010, at Bellator 22 in a rematch of a fight that took place in 2008. Stinson won via submission due to a rear-naked choke in the first round.

Stinson replaced Rory Markham against Steve Carl for a spot in Season Four Welterweight Tournament on August 26, 2010, at Bellator 26. Stinson lost via technical submission in the first round.

Stinson faced Nate James on April 9, 2011, at Bellator 40. He won via split decision (29-28 Stinson, 29-28 James, 29-28 Stinson).

Stinson was expected to face Joey Gorczynski on May 7, 2011, at Bellator 43. However, for undisclosed reasons the match was scrapped.

Strikeforce
Stinson made his debut against Eduardo Pamplona on July 30, 2011, at Strikeforce: Fedor vs. Henderson. He won via knockout at 15 seconds of round one.

Stinson faced Tarec Saffiedine on January 7, 2012, at Strikeforce: Rockhold vs. Jardine. Saffiedine defeated Stinson via split decision (29-28 Stinson, 30-27 Saffiedine, 29-28 Saffiedine).

Stinson faced Jordan Mein on July 14, 2012, at Strikeforce: Rockhold vs. Kennedy. Stinson lost via unanimous decision (30-27, 30-27, 30-27).

World Series of Fighting
In December 2013, it was announced that Stinson signed a four-fight deal with World Series of Fighting. He made his debut on January 18, 2014, against Valdir Araujo at WSOF 8 and won via TKO in the third round.

On March 29, 2014, Stinson fought former UFC veteran Josh Burkman at WSOF 9 and lost via knockout in the first round. This was the first knockout loss of Stinson's career.

Mixed martial arts record

|-
| Win
| align=center| 30–10
| Dave Burrow
| Decision (split)
| C3 Fights: Fight Night
| 
| align=center| 3
| align=center| 5:00
| Newkirk, Oklahoma, United States
| 
|-
| Win
| align=center| 29–10
| Jose Figueroa
| Decision (split)
| Titan FC 31
| 
| align=center| 3
| align=center| 5:00
| Tampa, Florida, United States
| 
|-
| Loss
| align=center| 28–10
| Joshua Burkman
| KO (punch)
| WSOF 9
| 
| align=center| 1
| align=center| 2:15
| Las Vegas, Nevada, United States
| 
|-
| Win
| align=center| 28–9
| Valdir Araujo
| TKO (punches)
| WSOF 8
| 
| align=center| 3
| align=center| 2:23
| Hollywood, Florida, United States
| 
|-
| Win
| align=center| 27–9
| Armando Montoya Jr.
| TKO (punches)
| Prize Fighting Championship 4
| 
| align=center| 1
| align=center| 3:38
| Denver, Colorado, United States
| 
|-
| Win
| align=center| 26–9
| Rob Kimmons
| TKO (punches)
| Epic Fight Night 1: Stinson vs. Kimmons
| 
| align=center| 1
| align=center| 0:54
| Kansas City, Missouri, United States
| 
|-
| Win
| align=center| 25–9
| Zac Kelley
| KO (punch)
| C3 Fights: Armageddon 2012
| 
| align=center| 1
| align=center| 4:34
| Newkirk, Oklahoma, United States
| 
|-
| Loss
| align=center| 24–9
| Jordan Mein
| Decision (unanimous)
| Strikeforce: Rockhold vs. Kennedy
| 
| align=center| 3
| align=center| 5:00
| Portland, Oregon, United States
| 
|-
| Loss
| align=center| 24–8
| Tarec Saffiedine
| Decision (split)
| Strikeforce: Rockhold vs. Jardine
| 
| align=center| 3
| align=center| 5:00
| Las Vegas, Nevada, United States
| 
|-
| Win
| align=center| 24–7
| Ryan Bixler
| Submission (triangle choke)
| C3 Fights: Fall Brawl
| 
| align=center| 1
| align=center| 2:54
| Newkirk, Oklahoma, United States
| 
|-
| Win
| align=center| 23–7
| Eduardo Pamplona
| KO (punch)
| Strikeforce: Fedor vs. Henderson
| 
| align=center| 1
| align=center| 0:15
| Hoffman Estates, Illinois, United States
| 
|-
| Win
| align=center| 22–7
| Nate James
| Decision (split)
| Bellator 40
| 
| align=center| 3
| align=center| 5:00
| Newkirk, Oklahoma, United States
| 
|-
| Win
| align=center| 21–7
| Matt Delanoit
| KO (punch)
| C3 Fights: SlamFest
| 
| align=center| 1
| align=center| 3:56
| Newkirk, Oklahoma, United States
| 
|-
| Loss
| align=center| 20–7
| Steve Carl
| Technical submission (guillotine choke)
| Bellator 26
| 
| align=center| 1
| align=center| 2:30
| Kansas City, Missouri, United States
| 175 lb Catchweight; Bellator Season Four Welterweight Tournament Qualifier.
|-
| Win
| align=center| 20–6
| Mike Jackson
| KO (punches)
| C3 Fights: Slammin Jammin Weekend 5
| 
| align=center| 3
| align=center| 3:42
| Newkirk, Oklahoma, United States
| 
|-
| Win
| align=center| 19–6
| Leonardo Peçanha
| Submission (rear-naked choke)
| Bellator 22
| 
| align=center| 1
| align=center| 1:42
| Kansas City, Missouri, United States
| 
|-
| Loss
| align=center| 18–6
| Dan Hornbuckle
| Submission (triangle choke)
| Bellator 15
| 
| align=center| 1
| align=center| 2:03
| Uncasville, Connecticut, United States
| Bellator Season Two Welterweight Tournament Quarterfinal.
|-
| Win
| align=center| 18–5
| Jerome Martinez
| Submission (armbar)
| C3 Fights: Slammin Jammin Weekend 4
| 
| align=center| 1
| align=center| 1:47
| Newkirk, Oklahoma, United States
| 
|-
| Win
| align=center| 17–5
| Brandon Newsome
| Submission (triangle choke)
| Titan FC 14
| 
| align=center| 1
| align=center| 1:57
| Kansas City, Kansas, United States
| 
|-
| Win
| align=center| 16–5
| Matt Bean
| TKO (punches)
| C3 Fights: Slammin Jammin Weekend 1
| 
| align=center| 1
| align=center| 2:16
| Newkirk, Oklahoma, United States
| 
|-
| Loss
| align=center| 15–5
| Delson Heleno
| Submission (triangle choke)
| AOF 4: Damage
| 
| align=center| 1
| align=center| 4:44
| Tampa, Florida, United States
| 
|-
| Win
| align=center| 15–4
| Yasubey Enomoto
| TKO (punches)
| AOF 3: Rumble at Robarts
| 
| align=center| 3
| align=center| 1:59
| Sarasota, Florida, United States
| 
|-
| Win
| align=center| 14–4
| Drew Fickett
| TKO (punches)
| C3 Fights
| 
| align=center| 1
| align=center| 3:35
| Newkirk, Oklahoma, United States
| 
|-
| Win
| align=center| 13–4
| Jeff Davis
| TKO (punches)
| Havic Prizefighting: Downtown Throwdown 2
| 
| align=center| 1
| align=center| 2:09
| Wichita, Kansas, United States
| 
|-
| Win
| align=center| 12–4
| Eric Marriott
| Decision (unanimous)
| Mixed Martial Madness
| 
| align=center| 3
| align=center| 5:00
| Wichita, Kansas, United States
| 
|-
| Loss
| align=center| 11–4
| Leonardo Peçanha
| Submission (triangle choke)
| C3 Fights: Clash in Concho
| 
| align=center| 1
| align=center| N/A
| Concho, Oklahoma, United States
| 
|-
| Win
| align=center| 11–3
| Cory Brandt
| TKO (punches)
| C3 Fights: Showdown 2
| 
| align=center| 1
| align=center| 0:33
| Cherokee, North Carolina, United States
|
 |-
| Win
| align=center| 10–3
| Dominic Brown
| Submission
| Good Guys Promotions
| 
| align=center| 1
| align=center| 4:35
| Junction City, Kansas, United States
| 
|-
| Win
| align=center| 9–3
| Bill Albrecht
| TKO (punches)
| LFC 1: The Genesis
| 
| align=center| 1
| align=center| 0:16
| Wichita, Kansas, United States
| 
|-
| Win
| align=center| 8–3
| Joseph Sullivan
| TKO (punches)
| Independent Event
| 
| align=center| 1
| align=center| 0:32
| Wichita, Kansas, United States
| 
|-
| Loss
| align=center| 7–3
| Anthony Lapsley
| Submission (triangle choke)
| Midwest Cage Combat
| 
| align=center| 2
| align=center| 3:39
| Wichita, Kansas, United States
| 
|-
| Win
| align=center| 7–2
| Ken Jackson
| TKO (injury)
| IFO: Wiuff vs. Salmon
| 
| align=center| 1
| align=center| 2:24
| Las Vegas, Nevada, United States
| 
|-
| Win
| align=center| 6–2
| Tony Barker
| KO (punch)
| IFO: Eastman vs. Kimmons
| 
| align=center| 2
| align=center| 4:45
| Las Vegas, Nevada, United States
| 
|-
| Win
| align=center| 5–2
| Matt Priest
| KO (punch)
| Midwest Cage Combat
| 
| align=center| 1
| align=center| 0:10
| Wichita, Kansas, United States
| 
|-
| Loss
| align=center| 4–2
| Joe Bunch
| Decision (unanimous)
| Masters of the Cage 12
| 
| align=center| 3
| align=center| 5:00
| Norman, Oklahoma, United States
| 
|-
| Win
| align=center| 4–1
| Dominic Brown
| KO (punch)
| Good Guys Promotions
| 
| align=center| 1
| align=center| 4:35
| Wichita, Kansas, United States
| 
|-
| Win
| align=center| 3–1
| Quinton McCottrell
| KO (punch)
| Masters of the Cage 9
| 
| align=center| 1
| align=center| 0:09
| Norman, Oklahoma, United States
| 
|-
| Win
| align=center| 2–1
| Mike Messina
| Submission
| Masters of the Cage 4
| 
| align=center| 2
| align=center| 2:25
| Oklahoma City, Oklahoma, United States
| 
|-
| Win
| align=center| 1–1
| Kevin Adams
| TKO (punches)
| Masters of the Cage 3
| 
| align=center| 2
| align=center| 1:12
| Oklahoma City, Oklahoma, United States
| 
|-
| Loss
| align=center| 0–1
| Kevin Adams
| Decision (split)
| Masters of the Cage 2
| 
| align=center| 3
| align=center| 5:00
| Oklahoma City, Oklahoma, United States
|

See also
List of male mixed martial artists
List of current WSOF fighters

References

1986 births
Living people
People from Winfield, Kansas
American male mixed martial artists
Mixed martial artists from Kansas
Welterweight mixed martial artists